Gzim Rexhaj (born 8 June 1986) is a Slovenian footballer of Albanian descent who plays as a forward and is a coach for SSVg Heiligenhaus in Germany.

References

External links
 German career stats - FuPa

1986 births
Living people
Slovenian emigrants to Germany
Slovenian people of Albanian descent
Association football forwards
Slovenian footballers
Albanian footballers
ND Gorica players
NK Brda players
KFC Uerdingen 05 players
Slovenian expatriate footballers
Expatriate footballers in Germany
Slovenian expatriate sportspeople in Germany
Slovenia youth international footballers
Slovenia under-21 international footballers